Ant venom is any of, or a mixture of, irritants and toxins inflicted by ants.   Most ants spray or inject a venom, the main constituent of which is formic acid only in the case of subfamily Formicinae.

Ant stings
Of all extant ant species, about 71% are considered to be stinging species, as some subfamilies have evolutionarily lost the ability to sting. Notable examples include a few species of medical importance, such as Solenopsis (fire ants), Pachycondyla, Myrmecia (bulldog ants), and  Paraponera (bullet ants). In the case of fire ants, the venom consists mainly of alkaloid (>95%) and protein (<1%) components.  Stinging ants cause a cutaneous condition that is different from that caused by biting venomous ants.  Particularly painful are stings from fire ants, although the bullet ant's sting is considered by some to be the most painful insect sting.

First aid for fire ant bites includes external treatments and oral medicines.
 External treatments: a topical steroid cream (hydrocortisone), or one containing Aloe vera
 Oral medicines: antihistamines
 Applying zinc oxide or calamine lotion.

Severe allergic reactions can be caused by ant stings in particular and venomous stings in general, including severe chest pain, nausea, severe sweating, loss of breath, serious swelling, fever, dizziness, and slurred speech; they can be fatal if not treated.

See also 
 Acidopore
 Poneratoxin, the neurotoxic component of bullet ant venom
 Pulicosis (flea bites)
 Skin lesion
 Solenopsin, the primary toxin in fire ant venom

References

External links 

Parasitic infestations, stings, and bites of the skin
Myrmecology
Ants
Insect bites and stings
Arthropod attacks